The 1973–74 Los Angeles Kings season was the Kings' seventh season in the National Hockey League.

Offseason
Forward Serge Bernier (22 goals, 46 assists) jumped to the Quebec Nordiques of the WHA.

Regular season
After finishing strong in 1972–73 and barely missing the playoffs, the Kings had high hopes for the 1973–74 season. But the team started slowly and by the end of November, they were 5–14–3 and in last place. Then they made a blockbuster trade, sending their best defenseman Gilles Marotte to the New York Rangers for defenseman Sheldon Kannegiesser, forwards Mike Murphy, and Tom Williams, and speedy center Gene Carr. They improved a little, but were still 9 games under .500 at the end of February at 21–30–10 for 52 points and 7th place in the 8 team Western Division. The Kings then went 9–0–2 over the next 3 weeks and climbed into 3rd place, passing the Atlanta Flames, Minnesota North Stars, Pittsburgh Penguins, and St. Louis Blues. Going into the final game of the season, the Kings had clinched 3rd, but needed a win to finish .500 and needed to outscore the Vancouver Canucks by 8 goals to finish even in goal differential on the season, which was one of coach Bob Pulford's goals at the beginning of the season. Not only did the Kings win, they won 11–1 to finish .500 and with a plus goal differential for the first time in their history. The season also marked the debut of hall of fame broadcaster Bob Miller, who would broadcast Kings games until his retirement after the 2016-17 season.

Final standings

Schedule and results

Playoffs
Kings 1 at Black Hawks 3
Kings 1 at Black Hawks 4
Black Hawks 1 at Kings 0
Black Hawks 1 at Kings 5
Kings 0 at Black Hawks 1

The Kings were heavy underdogs against the Chicago Black Hawks but put up a strong showing. While Kings goalie Rogie Vachon was excellent, the difference was Chicago goalie Tony Esposito who was brilliant. Game one saw the Black Hawks score in the 3rd period to take a 2–1 lead and they added an empty net goal to win, 3–1. Game two was similar; this time Chicago led 3–1 when they scored an empty net goal late to make it 4–1.

Game 3 in Los Angeles was the Kings first home playoff game in 5 years and was one of the strangest games in post season history. Chicago scored goal in the first minute of the game and then went into a defensive shell, practically daring the Kings to try to beat Esposito. Almost the entire rest of the game was played in the Black Hawk zone with the Kings dominating the action. But try as they might, they could not get the puck past Tony Esposito. Their best chance came midway through the 3rd period when Bob Berry pounced on a rebound and shot it over Esposito but the puck glanced off the cross bar. Despite totaling only 5 shots on goal for the game, the Black Hawks won 1–0 and had a commanding 3–0 series lead. Game 4 was played the very next day so both coaches rested their #1 goalies; the Kings played Gary Edwards over Rogie Vachon and Chicago went with Mike Veisor over Tony Esposito. The Kings were so relieved to have Esposito out that they dominated in a 5–1 win, their first playoff victory since a game 7 win over the Oakland Seals in the 1969 quarter-finals.

Another defensive struggle ensued in game 5 with Vachon and Esposito back in the nets; both made a number of brilliant saves and the game was 0–0 midway through the 3rd period. The Black Hawks won when Cliff Koroll scuffed the ice on a slap shot; the puck acted like a knuckleball change up and fooled Vachon for the game winner.

Player statistics

Awards and records

Transactions
The Kings were involved in the following transactions during the 1973–74 season.

Trades

Free agent signings

Intra-league Draft

Draft picks
Los Angeles's draft picks at the 1973 NHL Amateur Draft held at the Queen Elizabeth Hotel in Montreal, Quebec.

Farm teams

See also
1973–74 NHL season

References

External links

Los
Los
Los Angeles Kings seasons
Los
Los